Bathos was a town of ancient Arcadia in the district Parrhasia, between Trapezus and Basilis. Near to a neighbouring fountain called Olympias, fire was seen to issue from the ground.

Its site is located between the modern Mavria and Kyparissia.

References

Populated places in ancient Arcadia
Former populated places in Greece
Parrhasia